The 2020 Men's EuroHockey Club Trophy II would have been the first edition of the EuroHockey Club Trophy II, Europe's tertiary men's club field hockey tournament organized by the European Hockey Federation. It would be held in Lisburn, Northern Ireland from 28 to 31 May 2020.

The tournament was canceled on 23 March 2020 due to the COVID-19 pandemic.

Qualified teams
 Paolo Bonomi
 Casa Pia
 Bra
 Lisnagarvey
 Slagelse
 Plzeň-Litice
 Whitchurch
 Zelina

See also
2020 Men's EuroHockey Club Trophy I

References

Men's EuroHockey Club Trophy II
Club Trophy
EuroHockey Club Trophy II